Sir Nathaniel Napier, 3rd Baronet (c. 1668 – 24 February 1728), of Moor Crichel, Dorset, was an English landowner and politician who sat in the English House of Commons from 1695 to 1708 and in the British House of Commons from 1710 to 1722.

Early life
Napier was the only surviving son of Sir Nathaniel Napier, 2nd Baronet, MP and his wife Blanche Wyndham, the daughter and coheiress of judge Sir Hugh Wyndham of Silton, Dorset. He was admitted at  Lincoln's Inn in 1683 and matriculated at Trinity College, Oxford 10 April 1685, aged 16. 

In 1709, he succeeded his father to the baronetcy and Crichel House. He married Jane Worsley, the daughter of Sir Robert Worsley, 3rd Baronet, MP, of Appuldurcombe, Isle of Wight in July 1691 but she died in 1692. He married secondly on 28 August 1694, Catherine Alington, the daughter of William Alington, 3rd Baron Alington, MP.

Career
Napier was returned unopposed at the 1695 general election as Member of Parliament (MP) for Dorchester on the family interest. He was returned unopposed in 1698 and topped the poll in a contest at the first 1701 general election. He was returned unopposed at the second election in 1701 and was joined in Parliament by his father at a subsequent by-election. He and his father were returned unopposed together in 1702. He was elected in a contest at the 1705 general election, but did not stand in 1708. He was re-elected as a Tory in contests in 1710 and 1713. He was returned unopposed at the 1715 general election but retired in 1722.

Death and legacy
Napier died at More Critchell on 24 February 1728. He and his second wife Catherine had three sons and three daughters:

 William
 Gerard
 Wyndham
 Diana
 Catherine
 Blanch.

He was succeeded in the baronetcy successively by his sons William and Gerard. The baronetcy became extinct on the death of Gerard's son. The estates then went to Humphrey Sturt, son of Diana and her husband Humphrey Sturt.

References

1668 births
1728 deaths
Politicians from Dorset
Members of Lincoln's Inn
Alumni of Trinity College, Oxford
Baronets in the Baronetage of England
Members of the Parliament of England for Dorchester
English MPs 1695–1698
English MPs 1698–1700
English MPs 1701–1702
English MPs 1702–1705
English MPs 1705–1707
Members of the Parliament of Great Britain for English constituencies
British MPs 1707–1708
British MPs 1710–1713
British MPs 1713–1715
British MPs 1715–1722